Patrick Carvalho dos Santos (born 6 February 1997), commonly known as Patrick Carvalho, is a Brazilian footballer who plays as a forward.

Career statistics

Club

Notes

References

1997 births
Living people
Brazilian expatriate footballers
Association football forwards
Campeonato Brasileiro Série C players
Swiss Challenge League players
Saudi Second Division players
Saudi First Division League players
Nova Iguaçu Futebol Clube players
Desportivo Brasil players
Fluminense FC players
FC Lahti players
Tupi Football Club players
FC Chiasso players
Al-Okhdood Club players
Al-Sahel SC (Saudi Arabia) players
Al-Ansar FC (Medina) players
Brazilian expatriate sportspeople in Finland
Brazilian expatriate sportspeople in Switzerland
Brazilian expatriate sportspeople in Saudi Arabia
Expatriate footballers in Finland
Expatriate footballers in Switzerland
Expatriate footballers in Saudi Arabia
Footballers from Rio de Janeiro (city)
Brazilian footballers